WLUE (1600 AM, "94.1 & 104.7 WLOU") is a radio station broadcasting an urban oldies format. Licensed to Eminence, Kentucky, United States, the station serves the Louisville, Kentucky, area. The station is currently owned by New Albany Broadcasting Co., Inc.

History
The station was first licensed for operation on February 24, 1966, under the call letters WSTL. On September 17, 1986, the station changed its call sign to WKXF; then on August 1, 1990, to WXLN; then on June 14, 1991, to WKXF; again on January 4, 2002, to WTSZ; on January 20, 2012, to WLUE; on February 6, 2013, to WLRS; and on June 3, 2016, back to WLUE.

On September 26, 2011, WTSZ changed its format to news/talk, branded as "NewsTalk 1570" (simulcasting WNDA 1570 AM New Albany, Indiana).

On May 25, 2015, WLRS changed its format to Spanish, branded as "La Poderosa".

The station changed its call sign to WKYI on December 15, 2017, to WBKI on January 19, 2018, and back to WKYI on February 8, 2018.

On October 9, 2018, WKYI split from its simulcast with WLRS and switched to a southern rock and classic country format branded as "My 94.1".

On August 15, 2022, WKYI changed its format from classic country/southern rock to a simulcast of urban oldies-formatted WLOU 1350 AM Louisville under new WLUE call letters.

Previous logos

References

External links

LUE (AM)
Radio stations established in 1966
1966 establishments in Kentucky
LUE
Urban oldies radio stations in the United States
Henry County, Kentucky